Agyrtidia olivensis is a moth of the subfamily Arctiinae. It was described by Joaquim P. Machado Filho and Alfredo Rei do Régo Barros in 1970. It is found in Brazil.

References

Moths described in 1970
Arctiinae of South America
Fauna of Brazil
Arctiinae